Juarez is a census-designated place (CDP) in Cameron County, in the U.S. state of Texas. The population was 1,017 at the 2010 census. Prior to the 2010 census the community was part of the Las Palmas-Juarez CDP. It is part of the Brownsville–Harlingen Metropolitan Statistical Area.

Geography
Juarez is in western Cameron County, bordered to the north and east by Harlingen and to the west by Las Palmas.

References

Census-designated places in Cameron County, Texas
Census-designated places in Texas